Actinodaphne johorensis is a species of plant in the family Lauraceae. It is endemic to Peninsular Malaysia. It is threatened by habitat loss.

References

johorensis
Endemic flora of Peninsular Malaysia
Vulnerable plants
Taxonomy articles created by Polbot